La cuna vacía is a 1949 Argentine drama film directed by Carlos Rinaldi on his directorial debut. It stars Ángel Magaña, Orestes Caviglia and Nelly Duggan. The film, based on a story by Florencio Escardó, covers the turbulent life of Dr. Ricardo Gutiérrez (played by Magaña).

Plot
The film begins with some sequences related to the youth of Dr. Gutiérrez, his arrival in Buenos Aires from his native Arrecifes, his law studies and his frustrated life as a writer and being the subject of unrequited love. An accident resulting in the death of a child changes his vocation and he goes on to study Medicine. There are battle scenes, featuring Gutiérrez in the Civil War and the Paraguayan War and, finally, his struggles as a pediatrician.

Cast
Ángel Magaña 
Orestes Caviglia 
Nelly Duggan 
Hugo Pimentel
José María Gutiérrez
Zoe Ducós
Ernesto Bianco
Pascual Nacaratti
Claudio Martino

Production
In April 1948, the production company Artistas Argentinos Asociados signed a contract with the renowned writer, essayist, journalist and pediatrician Florencio Escardó, whose pseudonym was Piolin de Macramé, to shoot a film based on his story of Dr. Ricardo Gutiérrez. The following month, Germán Gelpi began to design the sets and Carlos Rinaldi was hired as director. The shooting of the film between July 1948 and January 1949 was long and arduous, during which the director of photography Francis Boeniger had to retire to fulfill other commitments and was replaced by Humberto Peruzzi, a collaborator who had been present from the founding of the production company. According to the critic César Maranghello, Lucas Demare, who was one of the partners of Artistas Argentinos Asociados, actively participated in the direction of the film.

Reception
In 1982 the Academia Nacional de Bellas Artes described the film as "very picturesque and emotional, showing the social diseases of childhood".

References

External links
 

1949 films
1940s Spanish-language films
Argentine black-and-white films
Films directed by Carlos Rinaldi
1940s war drama films
Argentine war drama films
1949 drama films